The River Caragh is a river in County Kerry in southwestern Ireland.

The rare Kerry Slug is known to have been identified in the area.

References

External links
 

Rivers of County Kerry